Tuomas Kytömäki (born 14 February 1974, in Helsinki) is a Finnish actor, who became known for his role as Aleksi Salin in the Finnish soap series Salatut elämät in years 1999–2004, 2008, 2014 and again 2019.  He won the reality television series contest V.I.P. in 2004.

Filmography 
 Salatut elämät as Aleksi Salin (episodes 1–871, 1504–1573, 2685–2688, 3505–3508), (1999–2004, 2008, 2014, 2019)
 Pieni kuolema (1997)
 Suuri seikkailu (2001)
 Kymppitonni (2 episodes, 2005)
 Taistelevat julkkikset (1 episode, 2004)
 V.I.P. seikkailu (2004)
 Kuutamolla (1 episode, 2003)
 Jaajon jacuzzi (1 episode, 2003)
 Näin syntyy Salatut elämät (2000)

References

1974 births
Living people
Male actors from Helsinki